Jesús M. de Miguel Rodríguez (born 1947) is a sociologist and professor of sociology at the University of Barcelona where he is director of the sociological research group GRS.  He is also the representative for Spain on the committee of Social Sciences of the European Cooperation in the Field of Scientific and Technical Research at the European Commission.

Rodríguez has been a researcher at Yale University, Stanford University, University of California, San Diego, University of Maryland, College Park, University of Arizona, University of Adelaide, and Hosei University.  He has been editor of Social Science and Medicine, and has sat on the editorial board of Health Promotion, Health for All in Europe, and Contemporary Sociology.   He was chair of Estudios Españoles Príncipe de Asturias in Georgetown University, Washington DC.

Rodríguez has received ten national awards including the Premio Nacional de Investigación en Ciencias Sociales in 1982, two first prizes in the "Premio de Ensayo" of the Basque Country and the international award "Prince of Asturias Chair" in 1999.

Rodríguez earned a doctorate in political sciences from Complutense University and a PhD in sociology from Yale University.

He has been repeatedly accused by students and colleagues of professional misconduct and sexual abuses, but never brought to trial because of the legal prescription of the acts he was accused of.

Selected bibliography
Rodríguez has published more than fifty books and nearly one hundred and fifty professional articles both  in Spanish and English.

References 

Yale University alumni
Georgetown University faculty
University of California, Berkeley faculty
University of Arizona faculty
University of Maryland, College Park faculty
University of California, San Diego faculty
1947 births
Living people